Knock Knock is the third studio album by German electronic musician DJ Koze. It was recorded in Spain and released on May 4, 2018.

Critical reception

Knock Knock was ranked #3 on Pitchfork's list of best albums of 2018, with Ryan Dombal complimenting its varied styles and sounds, writing that the album is "a parallel musical universe, one based on a collector's knowledge and a sense of play, where the histories of dance music and hip-hop and psychedelia are all pulled together by the same gravitational force." Alex Petridis of The Guardian wrote: "[DJ Koze] has a knack of coming up with tunes that are hugely appealing, but never feel hackneyed or predictable; that sound like the work of a man with an appealingly odd, personal take on pop music in its multifarious forms."

Music video
The official music video for "Pick Up", the second single from the album as of November 2021, has received over 4 million views on YouTube and quoted by DJ Koze as "A video which leaves space for your own imagination!" It was animated by Terlina Lie.

Track listing
Credits adapted from GEMA. All tracks produced by DJ Koze.Sample Credits

 "Bonfire" contains a sample of "Calgary" written by Justin Vernon and Matthew McCaughan and performed by Bon Iver.
 "Pick Up" contains samples of "Neither One of Us (Wants to Be the First to Say Goodbye)" written by James Weatherly and performed by Gladys Knight & the Pips and a sample of "Pick Me Up, I'll Dance" written by Gene McFadden, John Whitehead and Ronald Rose and performed by Melba Moore.

Charts

References

2018 albums
DJ Koze albums
Sampledelia albums